Runa Capital is an international venture capital firm headquartered in Luxembourg that invests in deep tech (AI, machine learning, middleware, open source, etc), cloud business software, fintech, edutech and digital health startups in early stages. From 2010 through 2022 Runa Capital raised 3 funds and invested in over 100 companies in more than 14 countries of Europe and North America, including Nginx, MariaDB, Zopa, Brainly, drchrono, Smava, and Mambu.

History 

Runa Capital was founded by technological entrepreneurs Serg Bell and Ilya Zubarev (founders of Acronis and Parallels), and their MIPT mate Dmitry Chikhachev. The idea of the venture firm took shape in 2009 and was formally incorporated in 2010. The partners contributed their own money into the first fund and raised capital from friends and other international investors including Achim Weiss and Andreas Gauger, founders of German hosting provider 1&1, and Edward Nicholson, former CEO of Brunswick-UBS in Russia.

In 2011, Andre Bliznyuk, former head of Russia/CIS Equity Capital Markets Group in Goldman Sachs joined Runa Capital as investment partner. In 2022, the firm promoted its principials Konstantin Vinogradov and Michael Fanfant to general partners focusing on Europe and the U.S., respectively. As of June 2022, the firm had over 427 million dollars under management in 3 funds.

Funds 

 Runa Capital I, firm's first namesake fund was launched in 2010, reached its final size of $135 million by 2012 and was focused on investments from seed to Series B stage. The initial idea was to fund globally oriented Eastern European startups in the fields of cloud computing, machine learning, virtualization, mobile and internet apps, but later the partners expanded their investment area to Europe and USA.
 Runa Capital II was launched in 2014 and reached $135 million by 2016 with large commitments from the first fund's backers. The second fund aimed at Series A and B rounds. The firm's new office was opened in California in 2015.
 Runa Capital III exceeded the target sum of $135 and reached $157 million in May 2020. The third fund followed the focus on deep tech with additional interest towards quantum computing startups.
 Runa Capital Opportunity Fund I was launched in May 2022 and raised $69 million by Autumn 2022.

Investments 

Runa Capital invests from $1 million to $10 million, largely in Series A rounds. From 2010 through 2022 it invested in over 100 companies, equally split between North America and Europe:

Affiliated funds 

Quantum Wave (QWave) headquartered in Boston is a $30 million early-stage fund focused on companies working in the field of quantum technology.  Serg Bell is QWave's venture partner. According to TechCrunch, QWave effectively served as a "materials science" arm for Runa Capital. Its notable investments include Swiss quantum cryptography startup ID Quantique that was acquired by SK Telecom in 2018.

References

External links 
 	

Venture capital firms of the United States
Financial services companies based in California
Companies based in Palo Alto, California
Financial services companies established in 2010
2010 establishments in California